Baldomar is a locality and decentralized municipal entity located in the municipality of Artesa de Segre, in Province of Lleida province, Catalonia, Spain. As of 2020, it has a population of 79.

Geography 
Baldomar is located 64km northeast of Lleida.

References

Populated places in the Province of Lleida